"Octopus" (originally recorded as "Clowns and Jugglers" and also known as "The Madcap Laughs") is a song by Syd Barrett. In January 1970 it appeared on his first solo album The Madcap Laughs.

Writing
Barrett reflected on the song's writing:

"Octopus" directly quotes a section from "Rilloby-Rill" by English poet Sir Henry Newbolt (1862–1938). The song also features a variety of other influences.

Recording
Syd Barrett left Pink Floyd in April 1968, along with their manager Peter Jenner. Jenner led Barrett into EMI Studios to record some tracks in May, that would later be released on Barrett's first solo album. During the May sessions, Jenner failed to record, properly, any vocals at all for several tracks, including "Clown and Jugglers". Sessions stopped once Barrett was in psychiatric care, apparently after a drive around Britain in his Mini.

After New Year 1969, a somewhat recovered Barrett decided upon returning to a musical career; Barrett contacted EMI, and was passed on to Malcolm Jones, the then-head of EMI's new prog rock label, Harvest. Barrett wanted to recover the Jenner-produced sessions recordings; several tracks, including "Clowns and Jugglers", were improved upon.

An early version of the song, recorded with the band Soft Machine, was released on the Barrett rarities album Opel (1988) under the title "Clowns and Jugglers". The 1993 re-releases of The Madcap Laughs and Opel contain alternate versions of "Octopus" and "Clowns and Jugglers" respectively, as bonus tracks.

Release
The album's title came about as a result of co-producer David Gilmour mishearing a line from this song ("Well, the mad cat laughed at the man on the border..." - although the word "madcap" does figure in another of the song's lyrics, "To a madcap galloping chase"). "Octopus" is known for being Barrett's only single as a solo artist. It was released on 14 November 1969, two months before the release of The Madcap Laughs. In France, the single gained a picture sleeve, which had the drawing of an octopus on it. A very scarce exemplar of this single has been auctioned for 10,500 euros on 19 June 2016 (Lot 284) during an 8000 vinyl records sale organized by the "Discothèque de Radio France".

It was included on the multi-artist Harvest compilation A Breath of Fresh Air – A Harvest Records Anthology 1969–1974 in 2007. For later release in 2010, on An Introduction to Syd Barrett, David Gilmour added bass to one track, "Here I Go". In 2011, as part of Record Store Day Black Friday, a limited edition tin-set featuring a replica of the "Octopus" single yellow vinyl, with a 120-page book of photos of Barrett by photographer, Mick Rock, was released in the US.

Personnel
Syd Barrett – vocals, acoustic and electric guitars, producer
David Gilmour – bass guitar, drums, co-producer

References

Syd Barrett songs
1969 debut singles
Psychedelic songs
Songs written by Syd Barrett
Song recordings produced by David Gilmour
1968 songs
Songs based on poems